Dead Solid Perfect is a 1988 American film following the life of a professional golfer on the PGA Tour.  It was produced by HBO films and based on the 1974 novel of the same name by Dan Jenkins and written and directed by Bobby Roth.

Cast

 Randy Quaid ...  Kenny Lee
 Kathryn Harrold ...  Beverly T. Lee
 Jack Warden ...  Hubert 'Bad Hair' Wimberly
 Corinne Bohrer ...  Janie Rimmer
 Brett Cullen ...  Donny Smithern
 Larry Riley ...  Spec
 DeLane Matthews ...  Katie Beth Smithern
 John M. Jackson ...  Grover Scomer
 Bibi Besch ...  Rita
 Billy Akin ...  Donny's Caddy
 Linda Dona ...  Blonde
 John Durbin ...  Man
 Kate Finlayson ...  Writer
 Bob Harrison ...  Himself
 Ron Hayes ...  Official
 Peter Jacobsen ...  Himself
 Dixie K. Wade ...  Nedra
 Michael Laskin ...  Associate Producer
 Frank Li'Bay ...  Walter
 Burr Middleton ...  1st Official
 Lindy Miller ...  Himself
 Don Morrow ...  Golf Commentator
 Richardson Morse ...  2nd Official
 Rob Nilsson ...  Writer #2
 Mac O'Grady ...  Himself
 Keith Olbermann ...  Golf Commentator
 Annie O'Neill ...  Vera
 Dan Priest ...  Official
 Kate Rodger ...  Shapely Adorable (as Kathleen Rodger)
 R.J. Rudolph ...  Dr. Bernie Glatzer (as Dick Rudolph)
 Henry G. Sanders ...  TV Director
 David Schickele ...  Bartender
 Julie Simone ...  Fan
 Bill Smillie ...  Official
 Ann Walker ...  Waitress
 Chris Adamec ...  Overzealous fan (uncredited)
 James Andrew Clark ...  Spectator (uncredited)
 Riley Roden ...  Teenage boy (uncredited)
 Dan Jenkins... Hotel Guest (uncredited cameo)

Soundtrack

Dead Solid Perfect is the fifteenth soundtrack album by Tangerine Dream and their forty-first overall. It was recorded in 1988 but not released until 1991.

Home media
HBO Video never issued the film until 1993, when Warner Home Video released it on VHS. Dead Solid Perfect was never released on DVD or Blu-ray.

References

External links

 

1988 films
1988 comedy-drama films
1988 television films
1980s sports comedy-drama films
American sports comedy-drama films
Films directed by Bobby Roth
Films scored by Tangerine Dream
Golf films
HBO Films films
American comedy-drama television films
1980s American films